In mathematics, a shift matrix is a binary matrix with ones only on the superdiagonal or subdiagonal, and zeroes elsewhere. A shift matrix U with ones on the superdiagonal is an upper shift matrix.  The alternative subdiagonal matrix L is unsurprisingly known as a lower shift matrix. The (i,j):th component of U and L are

where  is the Kronecker delta symbol.

For example, the 5×5 shift matrices are

Clearly, the transpose of a lower shift matrix is an upper shift matrix and vice versa.

As a linear transformation, a lower shift matrix shifts the components of a column vector one position down, with a zero appearing in the first position.  An upper shift matrix shifts the components of a column vector one position up, with a zero appearing in the last position.

Premultiplying a matrix A by a lower shift matrix results in the elements of A being shifted downward by one position, with zeroes appearing in the top row. Postmultiplication by a lower shift matrix results in a shift left.
Similar operations involving an upper shift matrix result in the opposite shift.

Clearly all finite-dimensional shift matrices are nilpotent; an n by n shift matrix S becomes the null matrix when raised to the power of its dimension n.

Shift matrices act on shift spaces. The infinite-dimensional shift matrices are particularly important for the study of ergodic systems. Important examples of infinite-dimensional shifts are the Bernoulli shift, which acts as a shift on Cantor space, and the Gauss map, which acts as a shift  on the space of continued fractions (that is, on Baire space.)

Properties
Let L and U be the n by n lower and upper shift matrices, respectively. The following properties hold for both U and L.
Let us therefore only list the properties for U:
 det(U) = 0
 trace(U) = 0
 rank(U) = n − 1
 The characteristic polynomials of U is
 
 Un = 0. This follows from the previous property by the Cayley–Hamilton theorem.
 The permanent of U is 0.

The following properties show how U and L are related:

If N is any nilpotent matrix, then N is similar to a block diagonal matrix of the form

where each of the blocks S1, S2, ..., Sr is a shift matrix (possibly of different sizes).

Examples

 

Then,
 

Clearly there are many possible permutations. For example,  is equal to the matrix A shifted up and left along the main diagonal.

See also
 Clock and shift matrices
 Nilpotent matrix
 Subshift of finite type

Notes

References

External links
Shift Matrix - entry in the Matrix Reference Manual

Matrices
Sparse matrices